Larijan may refer to:
 Larijan, East Azerbaijan
 Larijan-e Olya, East Azerbaijan Province
 Larijan-e Sofla, East Azerbaijan Province
 Larijan, Markazi, Mazandaran Province
 Larijan District, in Mazandaran Province
 Larijan Hot Spring
 Bala Larijan Rural District, in Mazandaran Province